Mitchell John "M. J." Frankovich (September 29, 1909 – January 1, 1992), best known as Mike Frankovich, was an American football player turned film actor and producer. Frankovich was the adopted son of actor Joe E. Brown and his wife, Kathryn.

Biography
Frankovich attended Belmont High School in Downtown Los Angeles. He played football for UCLA and was inducted into UCLA Athletic Hall of Fame in 1986.

Frankovich served in the Army Air Corps during World War II. After the war, he moved to Europe with his wife. He became managing director of Columbia Pictures in Britain in 1955. Frankovich moved back to Los Angeles in 1963. In 1968 he gave up his position as vice president and became an independent producer at Columbia.

He served as president of the Los Angeles Memorial Coliseum Commission in the early 1980s, and helped to bring the Los Angeles Raiders football team and 1984 Summer Olympics to Los Angeles.

He received the Academy Awards' Jean Hersholt Humanitarian Award in 1983.

Family
A devout Catholic, Frankovich married his first wife, Georgiana (or Georgianna) Feagans, on January 15, 1938. No details are available regarding that marriage or how or when it ended. Known descendants are his fourth cousins, Williamson Frankovich and Haley Frankovich. 

He married actress Binnie Barnes in 1940. They remained married until his death.  He produced some of her late movies, including her last movie in 1973, 40 Carats, in which she portrayed Liv Ullman's mother.

Death

He died of pneumonia on New Year's Day, 1992.

Producer
Among his more than 30 productions of film and for television
were: Bob & Carol & Ted & Alice (1969), Cactus Flower (1969),  There's a Girl in My Soup (1970), Butterflies Are Free (1972), The 42nd Annual Academy Awards (1970), and John Wayne's last film, The Shootist (1976).

Select filmography
 Jesse James Rides Again (1947)
 The Black Widow (1947) (serial)
 G-Men Never Forget (1948) (serial)
 Dangers of the Canadian Mounted (1948) (serial)
 Fugitive Lady (1950)
 Decameron Nights (1953)
 Malaga (1954)
 Footsteps in the Fog (1955)
 Joe MacBeth (1955)
 Spin a Dark Web (1956) aka Soho Incident
 The War Lover (1962)
 Bob & Carol & Ted & Alice (1969)
 Marooned (1969)
 Cactus Flower (1969)
 The Looking Glass War (1970)
 The 42nd Annual Academy Awards (1970) (TV special)
 There's a Girl in My Soup (1970)
 Doctors' Wives (1971)
 The Love Machine (1971)
 $ (1971)
 Stand Up and Be Counted (1972)
 Butterflies Are Free (1972)
 40 Carats (1973)
 Bob & Carol & Ted & Alice (1973) (TV series)
 Report to the Commissioner (1975)
 From Noon Till Three (1976)
 State Fair (1976)
 The Shootist (1976)
 Ziegfeld: The Man and His Women (1978)
 All Star Party for Lucille Ball (1984)
 All-Star Party for Clint Eastwood (1986) (TV Special)

References

External links
 

1909 births
1992 deaths
People from Bisbee, Arizona
Sportspeople from Arizona
Burials at Forest Lawn Memorial Park (Glendale)
Jean Hersholt Humanitarian Award winners
20th-century American businesspeople
Deaths from pneumonia in California
Deaths from Alzheimer's disease
Neurological disease deaths in California
Catholics from Arizona
Film producers from Arizona
United States Army Air Forces personnel of World War II